Jerry Michael Supiran (born March 21, 1973) is an American former child actor. Supiran is best known for playing Jamie Lawson on the science-fiction sitcom Small Wonder, which aired from 1985 to 1989.

Career
Supiran has been credited with roles in nineteen television and movie performances, including guest-starring roles in several noted series of the era, including Galactica 1980, Little House on the Prairie, Mr. Belvedere, Newhart, Highway to Heaven, Trapper John, M.D., St. Elsewhere, and Archie Bunker's Place, along with several made-for-TV movies and a feature film called Uncommon Valor.

Personal life
As an adult, Supiran worked in a variety of Henderson, Nevada restaurants. In 2012 it was reported that Supiran was destitute, working as a full-time volunteer at a California homeless shelter. Supiran claimed that a former adviser and girlfriend stole from a large trust fund that held the savings from his acting career.

Filmography

Award nominations

References

External links
Official website

1973 births
20th-century American male actors
Male actors from California
American male child actors
American male film actors
American male television actors
People from Greater Los Angeles
Homeless people
Living people